Stadio Ciro Vigorito (formerly Stadio Santa Colomba) is a multi-use stadium in Benevento, Italy.  It is currently used mostly for football matches and is the home stadium of Benevento Calcio. The stadium is able to hold 25,000 people and was opened in 1979.

The stadium was named after , a sports executive, journalist and Italian entrepreneur working in the renewable energy sector.

References

External links

Ciro
Buildings and structures in Benevento
Benevento Calcio
Sports venues in Campania
Ciro